Mary Dailey (December 5, 1928 – December 5, 1965) was a utility infielder  and a pitcher who played in the All-American Girls Professional Baseball League. She was born in Lexington, Massachusetts.

Mary Dailey played for three different teams in five different transactions during her two seasons in the All-American Girls Professional Baseball League.

Originally an infielder, Dailey entered the league in 1950 with the South Bend Blue Sox and was dealt to the Peoria Redwings during the midseason. After opening 1951 with Peoria, she returned to South Bend and finished the year with the Battle Creek Belles.

In her last season, she was converted into a pitcher because of her arm strength. She was a .162 career hitter over 114 games, while posting a 1–0 pitching record and a 6.02 earned run average in 15 innings of work.

Dailey was not located after leaving the league in 1951. She died at her hometown Lexington, Massachusetts on her 37th birthday.

Twenty-three years after her death, Mary Dailey became part of Women in Baseball, a permanent display based at the Baseball Hall of Fame and Museum in Cooperstown, New York and unveiled in 1988 to honor the entire All-American Girls Professional Baseball League.

Career statistics
Batting 

Pitching

Fielding

Sources

All-American Girls Professional Baseball League players
South Bend Blue Sox players
Peoria Redwings players
Battle Creek Belles players
Baseball players from Massachusetts
People from Lexington, Massachusetts
Sportspeople from Middlesex County, Massachusetts
1928 births
1965 deaths
20th-century American women